Claudia-Liza Vanderpuije is a British newsreader. Since January 2018, she has been one of the main presenters on 5 News, alongside hosting the Weekend Breakfast Show on talkTV. She has also worked for Sky News and hosted the BBC programme 60 Seconds.

Early life
Vanderpuije grew up in West Kensington and attended Queen Mary College.

She is of Ghanaian descent.

Broadcasting career
Vanderpuije worked at Time FM in Romford, then as an assistant to the news editor at ITN News and at the Press Association; her first presenting job was at Vox Africa. Before hosting 60 Seconds she worked for BBC Look East. She has also presented 60 Seconds on BBC Three and on BBC News interactive.

At its launch in 2014, she worked for the London Live television channel, where she hosted Headline London at lunchtime.

Since January 2018, Vanderpuije has presented 5 News Tonight (Monday–Friday), 5 News at 5 (Fridays) and from June to August 2018, guest hosted a few editions of The Wright Stuff between Matthew Wright's departure and Jeremy Vine's arrival. She also covers for Vine during the holidays. In June 2021, she became a weekend presenter on Talkradio having previously hosted some shows as a stand-in.

Personal life
Claudia-Liza attended a Star 100 event in 2017, an event that promotes Ghanaian interests in the UK. She came to talk about her path to becoming a broadcaster. She told the audience that she has Ghanaian heritage, shared a career strategy she used to net her first job after becoming a mother at age 24.

References

External links
 
 

1979 births
Alumni of Queen Mary University of London
BBC newsreaders and journalists
Black British television personalities
English people of Dutch descent
English people of Ghanaian descent
Ga-Adangbe people
Ghanaian people of Dutch descent
ITN newsreaders and journalists
Living people
People from Accra
People from the Royal Borough of Kensington and Chelsea
Sky News newsreaders and journalists
Vanderpuije family of Ghana